Nessorhamphus is a genus of eels in the family Derichthyidae. It currently contains the following species:

 Nessorhamphus danae E. J. Schmidt, 1931 (Dana duckbill eel)
 Nessorhamphus ingolfianus (E. J. Schmidt, 1912) (Duckbill oceanic eel)

References

 

Derichthyidae